The Central American Junior and Youth Championships in Athletics (Spanish: Campeonatos Centroamericanos Juvenil A y B) is an athletics event organized by the Central American Isthmus Athletic Confederation (CADICA) (Spanish: Confederación Atlética del Istmo Centroamericano) open for athletes from member associations.

The event is divided into the Junior B Central American Championships and the Junior A Central American Championships. The Junior A category is open for girls and boys aged 18–19. The Junior B category is open for girls and boys aged 15–17. There is a report on an early Central American Junior Championship held in the year 1975 in Guatemala.  At least from 1997 on, it is verified that the competition is held annually. Records can be set by both Junior (U-20) and Youth (U-18) athletes who compete at the championships in their category representing one of CADICA's member federations.

Editions
The following list was compiled from the CADICA website, and from a variety of articles from the archives of a variety of different newspapers.

Junior records

Boys (U-20)

Girls (U-20)

Youth records
Key:

Boys (U-18)

Girls (U-18)

References

External links
CADICA website (in Spanish)

 
Under-20 athletics competitions
Under-18 athletics competitions
Junior